Michèle Chardonnet (born 27 October 1956) is a French athlete, who competed mainly in the 100 metre hurdles.

She competed for France in the 1984 Summer Olympics held in Los Angeles in the 100 metre hurdles where she won the bronze medal jointly with Kim Turner.

Prize list 

 29 selections for French National Athletic teams, from 1978 to 1984
 French record holder Indoors for 60 m hurdles in 1983,  8.13s
 French record holder Indoors for 50 m hurdles in 1981,  6.98s
  Bronze medal, 1984 Olympic Games—100m hurdles
  1983 Mediterranean Games 100m hurdles
  French National Champion 100 m hurdles in 1981 and 1983
  French National Champion 60 m hurdles in 1979, 1981, 1982 and 1983

External links
 
 

1956 births
Living people
French female hurdlers
Olympic bronze medalists for France
Athletes (track and field) at the 1984 Summer Olympics
Olympic athletes of France
Sportspeople from Toulon
Medalists at the 1984 Summer Olympics
Olympic bronze medalists in athletics (track and field)
Mediterranean Games gold medalists for France
Athletes (track and field) at the 1983 Mediterranean Games
Mediterranean Games medalists in athletics